Jules François Roger Joseph Mendy (born 14 November 1994), known as Prince Mendy, is a Senegalese professional footballer who plays as a defender for  club Nancy.

Career
Mendy began his career with Marseille, and played for one season with their B team in Championnat de France Amateur 2. He spent three seasons in Championnat National with Fréjus Saint-Raphaël and GS Consolat. He signed for newly promoted Ligue 2 side Quevilly-Rouen in July 2017.

Mendy made his professional debut for Quevilly-Rouen in a Ligue 2 1–1 tie with Lorient on 29 July 2017.

After three seasons with Quevilly-Rouen, Mendy signed for Laval on an initial one-year contract, with a second year subject to the club achieving promotion.

On 1 July 2022, Mendy signed a two-year contract with Nancy.

References

External links
 QRM Profile
 
 
 MadeinFoot Profile
 
 OM Profile

1988 births
French sportspeople of Senegalese descent
People from Ziguinchor
Living people
Senegalese footballers
French footballers
Black French sportspeople
Association football defenders
FC Sochaux-Montbéliard players
AS Cannes players
Olympique de Marseille players
ÉFC Fréjus Saint-Raphaël players
Athlético Marseille players
US Quevilly-Rouen Métropole players
Stade Lavallois players
U.D. Vilafranquense players
AS Nancy Lorraine players
Championnat National players
Championnat National 3 players
Ligue 2 players
Liga Portugal 2 players
Senegalese expatriate footballers
Expatriate footballers in Portugal